Ijuw may refer to:
Ijuw District
Ijuw (village)
Cape Ijuw